Cafunfo Airport  is an airport serving Cafunfo, in Lunda Norte Province, Angola.

The Cafunfo non-directional beacon (Ident: CF) is located on the field.

See also

 List of airports in Angola
 Transport in Angola

References

External links 
OpenStreetMap - Cafunfo
OurAirports - Cafunfo

Cafunfo